Orlando Claude Brown Sr. (November 12, 1970 – September 23, 2011) was an American football player who played offensive tackle in the National Football League (NFL) for the Baltimore Ravens and Cleveland Browns. He attended Howard D. Woodson High School. He played college football for Willie Jeffries at South Carolina State University. He was nicknamed "Zeus".

Early years
Brown was born in 1970 in Washington, D.C. Brown attended H. D. Woodson Senior High School. He went to South Carolina State University and played offensive tackle.

NFL career

Cleveland Browns
Brown signed with the Cleveland Browns as an undrafted free agent in 1993. He spent three seasons with the Browns.

Baltimore Ravens
In 1996, the Browns franchise was moved by owner Art Modell to Baltimore, becoming the Baltimore Ravens. In his first stint as a Raven, Brown who, at 6-foot-7, 360 pounds, was known as an energetic and intimidating player, earned the nickname "Zeus". In his prime he was one of the highest-paid offensive linemen in the NFL.

Second stint with Browns

Brown was signed as an unrestricted free agent by the "reactivated" Cleveland Browns before the 1999 season. During a December 19, 1999, game against the Jacksonville Jaguars, Brown was hit in the right eye by a penalty flag weighted with ball bearings thrown by referee Jeff Triplette. Triplette immediately apologized to Brown. Brown left the game temporarily, then returned to the field only to shove Triplette, knocking him to the ground. Brown was ejected from the game and had to be escorted off the field by his teammates. Brown was subsequently suspended by the NFL, but the suspension was lifted when the severity of his injury became apparent. Brown missed three seasons due to temporary blindness. Brown was one of only two players to have played for the original Cleveland Browns and the Browns after the team was revived in 1999, as most of the Browns roster was moved to Baltimore. The other player is Antonio Langham.

Out of football, injuries, and lawsuits

Brown sat out the entire 2000 NFL season waiting for his right eye to heal.  The Browns released him after the season. In 2001, he sued the NFL for $200 million in damages. According to reports, he settled for a sum between $15 million and $25 million in 2002.

Second stint with Ravens
Brown spent the 2001 and 2002 seasons in rehabilitation before he was picked back up by the Ravens in 2003. During the 2003 season, Brown started at both offensive and defensive tackle in a game against the Oakland Raiders. He remained with the team until being released in March 2006. Following his retirement, Brown retained ties with the Ravens and mentored players.

After football

After retiring from football, Brown went into the restaurant business, and became the owner of the first Fatburger franchise in Maryland.

In September 2009, Brown was arrested and charged with third-degree burglary and destruction of property.  The charges were later dropped.

Death

Brown was found dead on September 23, 2011, in his Baltimore townhouse. The state medical examiner ruled that Brown died of diabetic ketoacidosis, an ailment common among diabetics and caused by high blood sugar and lack of insulin.

Personal life 
Brown had three sons and two daughters. One son, Orlando Jr., plays in the National Football League.

References

1970 births
2011 deaths
American football offensive tackles
Baltimore Ravens players
Central State Marauders football players
Cleveland Browns players
Players of American football from Washington, D.C.
South Carolina State Bulldogs football players
H. D. Woodson High School alumni
Deaths from diabetes
Ed Block Courage Award recipients